The scaly-breasted woodpecker (Celeus grammicus), also known as the scale-breasted woodpecker, is a species of bird in subfamily Picinae of the woodpecker family Picidae. It is found in Bolivia, Brazil, Colombia, Ecuador, Peru, and Venezuela.

Taxonomy and systematics

The South American Classification Committee of the American Ornithological Society (SACC), the International Ornithological Committee, and the Clements taxonomy assign these four subspecies to the scaly-breasted woodpecker:

C. g. verreauxii (Malherbe, 1858)
C. g. grammicus (Natterer & Malherbe, 1845)
C. g. subcervinus Todd, 1937
C. g. latifasciatus Seilern, 1934

However, the scaly-breasted woodpecker's taxonomy is unsettled. BirdLife International's Handbook of the Birds of the World (HBW) follows the recommendation in a 2018 paper and treats the four as subspecies of the waved woodpecker (C. undatus). This article follows the four-subspecies model.

Description

The nominate subspecies C. g. grammicus weighs , C. g. verreauxii weighs , and C. g. latifasciatus weighs .

In the nominate subspecies, both sexes' heads are rufous-chestnut with a pointed crest; the crest usually has black streaks. Males have a wide red patch from behind the bill to the ear coverts; females lack it. Both sexes of adults are mostly rufous-chestnut with a pale greenish-yellow to yellow-buff rump. Their upperparts have narrow black bars that are slighter on the uppertail coverts. Their flight feathers are blackish with narrow rufous edges and pale greenish-yellow bases. The top side of their tail feathers is brown-black with chestnut edges and sometimes chestnut bases; the tail feather's undersides are brown or yellow-brown with cinnamon bases. Their underparts are rufous-chestnut with paler flanks that can be yellowish buff. Their breast has black bars and the belly sparse black spots. The adult's shortish bill is greenish to yellow-green or ivory, their iris red, and their legs dark greenish gray to gray. Juveniles are very similar to adults but their head is darker and their upperparts paler with wider bars.

Subspecies C. g. verreauxii has lighter barring on its underparts than the nominate. C. g. subcervinus is more cinnamon on its rump and flanks than the nominate, without a yellow tone. C. g. latifasciatus has pale cinnamon upperparts with yellow to buffish feather bases that show, and its rump is very pale. The mantle has wider bars than the nominate and the underparts are much paler.

Distribution and habitat

The subspecies of the scaly-breasted woodpecker are found thus:

C. g. verreauxii, from south-central Colombia into eastern Ecuador
C. g. grammicus, from southeastern Colombia and southern Venezuela south to northeastern and eastern Peru and western Brazil as far east as the lower Rio Negro and Rio Purus (but see below)
C. g. subcervinus, Brazil south of the Amazon between the Rio Purus and the Rio Tapajós and south into Mato Grosso
C. g. latifasciatus southeastern Peru, southwestern Brazil, and northern Bolivia.

Some sources extend C. g. grammicus range into French Guiana, but the SACC has no records in that country.

The scaly-breasted woodpecker inhabits a variety of wooded landscapes including the interior and edges of rainforest, terra firme and várzea forest, secondary forest, and treed savannah.

Behavior

Movement

The scaly-breasted woodpecker is a year-round resident throughout its range.

Feeding

The scaly-breasted woodpecker feeds on fruits, sap, and insects, especially ants. It forages on tree trunks, branches, and vines, from the tops of the canopy to the middle regions. It often forages in small family groups, and frequently joins mixed species feeding flocks. It captures prey by pecking, probing, and gleaning.

Breeding

The scaly-breasted woodpecker breeds between late February and April in Venezuela and possibly later in Brazil. Nothing else is known about its breeding biology.

Vocal and non-vocal sounds

The scaly-breasted woodpecker's most common vocalization has been rendered as "curry-kuuu", "doit-gua", "wuwee? kuuu", and "fuweét-tjeeuh"; the first syllable rises and the second falls. It also makes "very loud and metallic 'pring-pring!' notes". It does not drum often.

Status

The IUCN follows HBW taxonomy and so has assessed the combined scaly-breasted and waved woodpeckers as a single species rated as being of Least Concern. Combined they have a very large range. The population size is not known and is believed to be decreasing through habitat loss due to deforestation for agriculture and ranching. The scaly-breasted woodpecker is considered from uncommon to common in various parts of its range; it occurs in several protected areas.

References

scaly-breasted woodpecker
Birds of the Amazon Basin
scaly-breasted woodpecker
scaly-breasted woodpecker
scaly-breasted woodpecker
Taxonomy articles created by Polbot
Taxobox binomials not recognized by IUCN